Democratic Renewal (DIANA, Greek: Δημοκρατική Ανανέωση (ΔΗ.ΑΝΑ.), Dimokratiki Ananeosi) was a Greek political party founded by Konstantinos Stephanopoulos on September 6, 1985. It continued to exist until June 1994.

Stephanopoulos left the New Democracy party in August 1985 over a conflict with Constantine Mitsotakis together with 15 other members of parliament. The party was able to obtain one seat in the 1989 (June) election and one in the 1990 election.

Electoral results

Political parties established in 1985
Conservative parties in Greece
Political parties disestablished in 1994
Defunct political parties in Greece
1985 establishments in Greece